Liu Deli (劉德利; born January 1, 1980) is a Chinese wrestler who competed at the 2008 and 2012 Summer Olympics in the Greco-Roman super-heavyweight division. In 2008, he lost in the third round to Dremiel Byers, and in 2012, he lost in the first round to Mihály Deák-Bárdos.

Liu Deli won the 2007 Asian Championships, and finished second at the 2010 Asian Games.

References

External links
 

1980 births
Living people
Olympic wrestlers of China
People from Jixi
Wrestlers at the 2008 Summer Olympics
Wrestlers at the 2012 Summer Olympics
Asian Games medalists in wrestling
Sportspeople from Heilongjiang
Wrestlers at the 2006 Asian Games
Wrestlers at the 2010 Asian Games
Chinese male sport wrestlers
Asian Games silver medalists for China
Medalists at the 2010 Asian Games
20th-century Chinese people
21st-century Chinese people